Elgin railway station is a railway station serving the town of Elgin, Moray in Scotland. The station is managed and served by ScotRail and is on the Aberdeen to Inverness Line, between Keith and Forres, measured  from Forres.

History 

The first station in Elgin was opened by the Great North of Scotland Railway (GNSR) on 10 August 1852 by the Morayshire Railway. The second owned by the Highland Railway was opened on 25 March 1858 by the Inverness and Aberdeen Junction Railway and later known as Elgin West.

The GNSR company prepared plans in the mid-1890s for a new station building which was intended to be a joint station with the Highland Railway. Mr P.M. Barnett, engineer-in-chief of the GNSR submitted a plan which proposed a diversion from the Highland company mainline and a new double line, with platforms on all, which would have resulted in the Highland company's existing lines becoming joint. GNSR trains from Craigellachie and Lossiemouth could run into different lines, and the Highland company's trains would stop opposite, allowing easy exchange between carriages. Despite a meeting between Barnett and Mr Roberts, the Highland company engineer, an agreement could not be reached. 

Construction started in 1899 and the new station was modified during construction. The new building opened on Saturday 30 August 1902. The upper part of the building provided accommodation to the manager's apartments, clerks and tea-rooms, and the western portion was the station masters's house. The ground floor comprised a large waiting-room with a circular glass roof, about 70ft in length and 30ft in width. All four platforms had an iron and glass canopy with the ironwork painted in pale blue colour. The clerk's office contained a row of telegraph instruments, and telephones communicating with the locomotive department, the signal cabins and with the Highland station. A pneumatic tube system conveying messages to and from other offices was also installed. The architect was the company engineer, P.M. Barnett. 

All three of the GNSR routes were closed in the 1960s as a result of the Beeching Axe, with the Lossiemouth branch the first to go in April 1964 and the other two routes following in May 1968.

Both stations were located about one mile to the south of Elgin town centre, which made them inconvenient for local journeys, e.g. to Lossiemouth, and bus services soon eliminated much of the local passenger traffic - passengers would generally only use the train service if they were connecting to long-distance trains. The stations were less than 500 metres apart and linked by a footpath.

The present station, formerly the West (ex-Highland) station, was retained in 1968-69 was rebuilt and the platforms were raised. The new passenger facilities proved inadequate and it was rebuilt again in a modern style by British Rail in 1990 at a cost of £400,000.

The GNSR station (known as Elgin East) was closed with the end of services on the coast and Craigellachie lines on 6 May 1968. The GNSR station building is still used as office accommodation and stands on the site of the original Morayshire Railway station. A sizeable goods yard is still in operation on this site.

Recent infrastructure improvements 
As well as the aforementioned timetable improvements, Transport Scotland agreed in 2014 to fund a £170 million infrastructure upgrade project for the line. This included signalling improvements, a longer loop and platform extensions for Elgin.

The level crossing was also converted to remote operation by CCTV from the location. The line reopened as scheduled on 17 October 2017.

Facilities 
The station has a ticket office, ticket machine and accessible toilets on platform 1, adjacent to which is the car park and bike racks. Both platforms are equipped with waiting shelters, benches and help points, and are linked by a footbridge and lifts.

Passenger volume 

The statistics cover twelve month periods that start in April.

Services

On Sundays, there are five trains each way to the main termini (one of which runs through to  via Aberdeen) and two from Glasgow via Inverness that terminate here.

References

Bibliography

External links

Elgin railway station video
Railscot - Elgin West
Photos of the disused station & yard at Elgin East (Railscot)

Railway stations in Moray
Former Highland Railway stations
Railway stations in Great Britain opened in 1858
Former Great North of Scotland Railway stations
Railway stations in Great Britain opened in 1852
Railway stations in Great Britain closed in 1968
Railway stations served by ScotRail
1852 establishments in Scotland
Elgin, Moray